The Böshorn (also known as Rauthorn) is a mountain of the Swiss Pennine Alps, overlooking Simplon in the canton of Valais. The mountain lies between the upper Nanztal and the Val Divedro.

References

External links
 Böshorn on Hikr

Mountains of the Alps
Alpine three-thousanders
Mountains of Switzerland
Mountains of Valais